Liger - Saala Crossbreed is a 2022 Indian sports action film written and directed by Puri Jagannadh. Shot simultaneously in Hindi and Telugu languages, the film is produced by Dharma Productions and Puri Connects. The film stars Vijay Deverakonda as the titular MMA fighter with stammering problem alongside Ananya Panday, Ramya Krishna and Ronit Roy in pivotal roles, with American boxer Mike Tyson playing an extended cameo appearance.

The film was announced in 2019, and the title Liger was announced in January 2021. Liger marks the debut of Deverakonda in Hindi cinema and Panday in Telugu cinema. The songs are composed by Tanishk Bagchi, Sunil Kashyap, Jaani, DJ Chetas, Lijo George and Vikram Montrose. Principal photography began in January 2020 and suffered production delays after March 2020 due to the COVID-19 pandemic. Filming resumed in February 2021 and after some other shooting suspensions in the pandemic, Liger was wrapped up in February 2022.

Liger was released theatrically on 25 August 2022 and received highly negative reviews and was panned by both critics and audience, with criticism on the films's script, direction, cast performance, soundtrack, and mocking of Mike Tyson’s role & ending. Eventually, the film became a box-office bomb.

Plot 
After his father, Lion Balram Agarwal's death, in the MMA National Championship, Sashwath Agarwal aka Liger and his mother, Balamani, move to Mumbai from Banaras/Karimnagar. Balamani is determined to turn Liger into a MMA champion and takes him to a coach named Christopher, who trains him. While Liger is on his way to perfection in the sport, he meets a rich young woman, Tanya, and falls in love with her. After learning from her brother, Sanju, that Liger has a stammering problem, Tanya apparently embarrassed, leaves him. Liger wins the national championship after getting motivated by the rejection. He moves on to participate in the International Championship, sponsored by Sanju and Tanya's father. 

Liger wins every match and moves on to the finals. However, Tanya is kidnapped days before the finals. Upon getting to know of this, Liger confronts Tanya's father. He reveals that he borrowed money from a gangster to set up his business, and remains helpless, as he could not repay the money back to him. After her father reveals that Tanya broke up with Liger so he could focus on his sport and career after his mother chastised her for being a distraction, Liger decides to save Tanya by himself, which ultimately causes him to miss the final match. He stumbles upon the kidnapper who happens to be Mark Anderson, Liger's life long role model and legendary MMA fighter. 

Anderson challenges him to a fight to get Tanya back. The fight is live streamed at the MMA final. When Liger is on the verge of losing, he remembers the advice that Balamani gave him and defeats Anderson. Impressed by his skills, Anderson takes a picture with Liger and Tanya, and lets them go. As a result of the successful fight, the MMA jury declares the fight between Anderson and Liger as the final match. Liger becomes a MMA World Champion.

Cast 
 Vijay Deverakonda as Liger, Tanya's love interest and Balamani's son
 Ananya Panday as Tanya Pandey, Liger's love interest and Sanju's younger sister
 Ramya Krishna as Balamani, Liger's mother
 Ronit Roy as Christopher, Liger's MMA coach
 Vish as Sanju Pandey, Tanya's elder brother
 Ali as Ali Bhai
 Makarand Deshpande
 Getup Srinu as Ganpath, Liger's friend
 Chunky Panday as Panday, Tanya and Sanju's father
 Mike Tyson as Mark Anderson (extended cameo appearance)

Production

Pre-production 
Vijay Deverakonda who plays a MMA Fighter with a stutter, underwent a dramatic physical transformation for his role and went to Thailand for martial arts training. After Janhvi Kapoor refused the offer due to dates issues, Ananya Panday was cast opposite Deverakonda. The film's score is composed by Mani Sharma. Composer Tanishk Bagchi is also signed for the film. In September 2021, boxer Mike Tyson was signed for an extended cameo, thus making his acting debut in Indian cinema.

Filming 
Filming began on 20 January 2020 in Mumbai, with the tentative title Fighter. 40 days of shoot was completed when production was halted in March 2020 due to the COVID-19 pandemic in India. The filming resumed in February 2021. The second schedule was shot in Hyderabad. The filming was delayed again in April 2021 due to the second wave of the COVID-19 lockdown. The cast and crew resumed the shoot in September 2021. In November 2021, the cast and crew went to Las Vegas to shoot the portions with Mike Tyson. The filming was completed in February 2022.

Soundtrack

The music rights are sold to Sony Music India. The first single titled "The Liger Hunt Theme" was released on 9 May 2022, on the occasion of Vijay Deverakonda's birthday. The second single titled "Akdi Pakdi" was released on 11 July 2022. The third single titled "Waat Laga Denge" sung by Vijay Deverakonda was released on 29 July 2022.
The fourth single titled "Aafat" was released on 6 August 2022. The fifth single titled "Coka 2.0" was released on 12 August 2022.

Release

Theatrical 
Liger was released on 25 August 2022 in Hindi and Telugu along with dubbed versions in Tamil, Malayalam and Kannada. Earlier in January 2021, the film's release date of 9 September 2021 was announced . But due to production delays caused by COVID-19 pandemic, the film was postponed. The current release date was announced in December 2021.

The film's worldwide theatrical rights were valued at  crore, the highest for any Deverakonda film.

Home media
The satellite rights of the film have been acquired by Star India Network, while the digital rights for streaming have been acquired by Disney+ Hotstar. The film was digitally streamed on Disney+ Hotstar from 22 September 2022 in Telugu and dubbed versions of Tamil, Malayalam and Kannada languages. The Hindi version premiered on 21 October 2022.

Distribution
AA Films and Sri Karthikeya Cinemas has acquired All India distribution rights while Sarigama Cinemas and Phars Film Co acquired overseas distribution rights.

Reception

Critical reception
Liger received negative reviews from critics and audience. Neeshita Nyayapati of The Times Of India rated the film 2 out of 5 stars and wrote, "It's ironic that Liger is asked to focus multiple times in the film, but the script itself lacks the same focus". Janani K of India Today rated the film 2 out of 5 stars and wrote, "Liger is a convoluted sports drama with a lacklustre story. In other words, Liger is a wasted opportunity". Arvind V of Pinkvilla rated the film 2 out of 5 stars and wrote, "The performances are mixed at best. Vijay Deverakonda is measured and earnest". Sonil Dedhia of News 18 rated the film 1.5 out of 5 stars and wrote, "Liger seems so long that by the end, I started feeling why did I get into this Aafat". She also called Deverakonda's performance as repetitive and tiresome. Sudhir Srinivasan of The New Indian Express rated the film 1.5 out of 5 stars and called it 'a crossbreed between cringe and cliché'. He added, "The kicks and punches in Puri Jagannadh's weakly written Liger seem directed at us". A reviewer for Bollywood Hungama rated the film 1.5 out of 5 stars and wrote, "On the whole, Liger fails to impress due to its silly and bizarre narrative and poor writing. At the box office, it will have a tough time attracting the audience to cinemas". 

Shubhra Gupta of The Indian Express rated the film 1 out of 5 stars and wrote, "There's nothing new or fresh about the ingredients that go into the making of this Liger. The plot is filled with all kinds of outlandish situations, and the treatment is jaded". Saibal Chatterjee of NDTV rated the film 1 out of 5 stars and wrote, "Liger is massive mess of a movie that Vijay Deverakonda's newfangled physique and action chops cannot salvage". Sukanya Verma of Rediff.com rated the film 1 out of 5 stars and wrote, "Director Puri Jagannadh's off-putting humour and ridiculous ambitions ensure Liger is a dead duck from the word go". Suresh Bishnoi of cinereveal.com rated the film 1.5 out of 5 stars and wrote, "The film presents a fine example of action choreography, but casting, acting and direction is so sick". Stutee Ghosh of The Quint rated the film 1 out of 5 stars and called the film 'a disappointment of colossal portions'. Sanyukta Thakare of Mashable India rated the film 0.5 out of 5 stars and said, "0.5 is for the longest fight montage I have even seen, also only good part of the movie." Anna M.M. Vetticad of Firstpost rated the film 0 .1 out of 5 stars and wrote "Liger overflows with the signature tackiness of Puri Jagannadh's films and the misogyny that Vijay Deverakonda has proudly worn on his sleeve since he struck box-office gold with Arjun Reddy".

Sanjukta Sharma of Moneycontrol noted in her review, "Devarakonda has the swagger of a testosterone bomb but has no consistence in his impersonation of either the lover or the fighter. Liger is an example of how cringe-worthy big Bollywood can get to resuscitate ticket sales. This attempt is out-and-out a lost case of such desperation." Monika Rawal Kukreja of Hindustan Times wrote in her review, "Puri Jagannadh's Liger is extremely flawed and below average for the hype it created". She added that the film is devoid of any coherent plot, performances, or action that does not involve the hero strutting in slow-motion. Shomini Sen of WION in her review noted, "Lots of mindless action sequences, arbitrary songs and a story that lacks logic- 'Liger' feels like an ordeal to sit through". Aditi Chavan of First India wrote in her review, "Overall, Liger is a meme-worthy asinine film that does not do justice as Vijay's Hindi debut."

Box office
Liger grossed  crore worldwide on its opening day including  crore from Andhra Pradesh and Telangana, with a distributor share of  crore including  crore from overseas market. On second day it collected ₹7.7 crore worldwide, on third and fourth day it collected ₹6.55 crore and ₹5.24 crore respectively. So on the weekend it collected India net ₹35.44 crore and ₹48.5 crore worldwide gross.and on fifth day it collected ₹1.5 crore.

Liger performed poorly at the box office. Latha Srinivasan of Firstpost attributed the film's failure to over-hyped promotions and audience expectations. Writing for Hindustan Times, Abhimanyu Mathur stated that the film's team tried to manufacture a pan-Indian success by casting actors from Hindi film industry and failed.

In October 2022, News18 Telugu reported that the film has collected a total worldwide gross of  crore with a distributors' share of  crore. Thus, the film incurred a total loss of  crore.

References

External links 
 

2022 multilingual films
Films directed by Puri Jagannadh
Films postponed due to the COVID-19 pandemic
Films scored by Mani Sharma
Films shot in Mumbai
Indian multilingual films
Films scored by Tanishk Bagchi
Films scored by Vikram Montrose
Sports action films
Indian sports films
Indian action films
2020s Telugu-language films
2020s Hindi-language films
Mixed martial arts films